Park House, at 7–11 Onslow Square, is a detached house in the South Kensington district of the Royal Borough of Kensington and Chelsea in London SW7.

Park House was created from a pair of lodges, Pelham Cottage and Park Cottage built in the 1840s that were merged into a single property in the 1980s.

The house was owned by Mark Birley who lived there with his wife Annabel Goldsmith. Goldsmith wrote a memoir, No Invitation Required: The Pelham Cottage Years about her time at the house. Goldsmith described her first visit to the house creating a "catch of pure excitement in my throat...I could not believe that such an oasis could exist only a few yards from South Kensington Tube station. In my daze of delight, I knew immediately that I had stumbled upon something magical".

The house was sold by the German art historian and industrial heir Gert-Rudolf Flick for £40 million to the businessman Richard Caring in 2017. Flick described Park House as "almost a country house in the middle of London". The house had been on sale for £105 million since September 2013.

Caring has submitted proposals to demolish the present house and replace it with an  six-bedroomed two-storey house with a double-level basement. Caring's proposal received 22 letters of objection from local residents. A £235,000 payment for local housing in the Royal Borough of Kensington and Chelsea formed part of the conditions for the council's approval of the plans.

References

Houses in the Royal Borough of Kensington and Chelsea
South Kensington